Timeslip (known as The Atomic Man in the United States) is a 1955 British black-and-white science fiction film directed by Ken Hughes and starring Gene Nelson and Faith Domergue. Produced by Alec C. Snowden, it is based on a script by Charles Eric Maine, who also wrote Spaceways.

In the UK, the film was distributed by Anglo-Amalgamated. In 1956 the film was shortened from 93 minutes to 76 minutes and distributed in the U.S. by Allied Artists Pictures in some areas as a double feature with Invasion of the Body Snatchers.

Plot
An injured man is pulled from the Thames. He has been shot in the back and is barely alive. The science correspondent of an illustrated magazine recognises him as a nuclear physicist. But the physicist is found alive and well and working at his laboratory. When the injured man is photographed, his pictures show a strange glow surrounding him, and when he recovers enough to be questioned, his answers make no sense. It transpires that his perception of time is 7.5 seconds ahead of that of his interrogator, to the extent that he answers questions just before they are asked.

The correspondent and his photographer girlfriend try to solve the puzzle, and in doing so uncover international industrial espionage and a terrible threat to the atomic research institute.

Cast

Gene Nelson as Mike Delaney
Faith Domergue as Jill Robowski
Peter Arne as Dr. Stephen Rayner/Jarvis
Joseph Tomelty as Detective Inspector Cleary
Donald Gray as Robert Maitland
Vic Perry as Emmanuel Vasquo
Paul Hardtmuth as Dr. Bressler
Martin Wyldeck as Dr. Preston
Leonard Williams as Detective Sergeant Haines
Charles Hawtrey as Office boy

Production
The script for the film was a substantial reworking by Charles Eric Maine of his BBC TV play Time Slip, which was transmitted live on 25 November 1953, and not recorded. In the original play, Jack Mallory (Jack Rodney) dies and is brought back to life with an adrenaline injection, but this results in his perception of time being 4.7 seconds ahead of everybody else's, so he is able to answer their questions before they are even asked. His psychiatrist "cures" him by smothering him to death and then reviving him with a second - but more carefully measured - dose of adrenalin.

The film was partially funded by its UK distributor, Anglo-Amalgamated. It was a production of Todon Productions, the American company, although they are not credited. Star Gene Nelson had been in two musicals, So This Is Paris and Oklahoma!, and this was his first serious dramatic lead. He was reportedly cast after Tony Owen of Todon saw Nelson on an episode of Studio One.

Filming started in England on 4 February 1955. It was shot at Merton Park Studios.

The Isotope Man
Maine turned the script into a novel, The Isotope Man, published in 1957. It would be the first of three novels about reporter Mike Delaney. The New York Times called the novel "fairly crude and preposterous but lively enough". The Los Angeles Times called it "near perfect entertainment for the radioactive age."

Critical reception
TV Guide called it a "dumb movie with an interesting premise"; and AllMovie similarly thought its "absolutely fascinating premise" unfortunately translated into "lack of imagination in the script"; but from an able cast, Faith Domergue was "especially welcome", and the reviewer concluded "The budget is clearly low, but (Ken) Hughes does well with what he has."

References

Bibliography
 Warren, Bill. Keep Watching the Skies: American Science Fiction Films of the Fifties, 21st Century Edition. Jefferson, North Carolina: McFarland & Company, 2009 (First Edition 1982). .

External links

Timeslip at BFI
Timeslip at Reel Streets
Timeslip at Letterbox DVD
Complete film at Internet Archive

1955 films
British science fiction films
1950s science fiction films
British black-and-white films
Films based on British novels
Films directed by Ken Hughes
Columbia Pictures films
1950s English-language films
1950s British films